Sheymon da Silva Moraes (born October 11, 1990) is a Brazilian mixed martial artist (MMA) who competes in the Featherweight division. A professional mixed martial artist since 2012, Moraes has also competed in the UFC andProfessional Fighters League (PFL).

Background
Niterói, Rio de Janeiro, Brazil, Moraes trained and competed in judo from his early childhood to the age of 12. After walking away from the sport, he started training Brazilian jiu-jitsu, Muay Thai and kickboxing for fun. Eventually he started competing in Muay Thai which led him to mixed martial arts.

Mixed martial arts career

Early career 
Moraes started his professional MMA career in 2012. Racking up a record of 6–0 in his native Brazilian circuit, Moraes signed a four-fight contract with World Series of Fighting. He amassed a record of 3–1 in the organization, challenging Marlon Moraes for the WSOF Bantamweight Championship but losing in the effort.

Ultimate Fighting Championship
He joined UFC after settling a two-year contract dispute with World Series of Fighting.

Moraes made his UFC debut on November 25, 2017 against Zabit Magomedsharipov at UFC Fight Night: Bisping vs. Gastelum.  He lost the fight via a submission.

His next fight came on August 4, 2018 at UFC 227 against Matt Sayles. He won the fight in a unanimous decision.

Moraes faced Julio Arce on November 3, 2018 at UFC 230. He won the fight via split decision.

Moraes faced Sodiq Yusuff on March 30, 2019 at UFC on ESPN 2. He lost the fight via unanimous decision.

Moraes faced Andre Fili on July 13, 2019 at UFC Fight Night 155. He lost the fight via knockout in round one and was subsequently released from the promotion.

Professional Fighters League 
On October 6, 2020, news surfaced that Moraes had signed with the Professional Fighters League.

2021 season 
Moraes made his PFL debut against Brendan Loughnane on April 23, 2021 at PFL 1. He lost the bout via KO in the first round.

Moraes was scheduled to face Movlid Khaybulaev at PFL 4 on June 10, 2021. A day before the event, Movlid was pulled and Moraes was rescheduled to face Jesse Stirn. He won the bout via a kimura submission at the end of the second round.

Moraes faced Lazar Stojadinovic on August 27, 2021 at PFL 9. He won the fight via TKO in the second round.

2022 season 
Moraes faced Boston Salmon on April 28, 2022 at PFL 2. He won the bout via unanimous decision.

Moraes faced Lance Palmer on June 24, 2022 at PFL 5. He lost the bout via unanimous decision.

Moraes faced Marlon Moraes, replacing the injured Shane Burgos on November 25, 2022, at PFL 10. He won the bout in the third round via TKO stoppage.

Championships and accomplishments

Kickboxing / Muay Thai 
 Brazilian Kickboxing Champion (Three times)
 Muay Thai Brazilian Champion (Two times)

Mixed martial arts record

|-
|Win
|align=center|15–6
|Marlon Moraes
|TKO (punches)
|PFL 10
|
|align=center|3
|align=center|0:58
|New York City, New York, United States
|
|-
|Loss
|align=center|14–6
|Lance Palmer
|Decision (unanimous)
|PFL 5
|
|align=center|3
|align=center|5:00
|Atlanta, Georgia, United States
|
|-
|Win
|align=center|14–5
|Boston Salmon
|Decision (unanimous)
|PFL 2
|
|align=center|3
|align=center|5:00
|Arlington, Texas, United States
|
|-
|Win
|align=center|13–5
|Lazar Stojadinovic	
|TKO (punches)
|PFL 9 
|
|align=center|2
|align=center|4:45
|Hollywood, Florida, United States
|
|-
|Win
|align=center|12–5
|Jesse Stirn
|Submission (kimura)
|PFL 4 
|
|align=center|2
|align=center|4:59
|Atlantic City, New Jersey, United States
|
|-
|Loss
|align=center|11–5
|Brendan Loughnane
|KO (punches)
|PFL 1 
|
|align=center|1
|align=center|2:55
|Atlantic City, New Jersey, United States
|
|-
|Loss
|align=center|11–4
|Andre Fili
|KO (punches)
|UFC Fight Night: de Randamie vs. Ladd 
|
|align=center|1
|align=center|3:07
|Sacramento, California, United States
|
|-
|Loss
|align=center|11–3
|Sodiq Yusuff
|Decision (unanimous)
|UFC on ESPN: Barboza vs. Gaethje 
|
|align=center|3
|align=center|5:00
|Philadelphia, Pennsylvania, United States
|
|-
|Win
|align=center|11–2
|Julio Arce
|Decision (split)
|UFC 230
|
|align=center|3
|align=center|5:00
|New York City, New York, United States
|
|-
|Win
|align=center|10–2
|Matt Sayles
|Decision (unanimous)
|UFC 227
|
|align=center|3
|align=center|5:00
|Los Angeles, California, United States
|
|-
|Loss
|align=center|9–2
|Zabit Magomedsharipov
|Submission (anaconda choke)
|UFC Fight Night: Bisping vs. Gastelum
|
|align=center|3
|align=center|4:30
|Shanghai, China
|
|-
|Win
|align=center|9–1
|Luis Palomino
|Decision (unanimous)
|WSOF 31
|
|align=center|3
|align=center|5:00
|Mashantucket, Connecticut, United States
|
|-
|Win
|align=center|8–1
|Robbie Peralta
|TKO (punches)
|WSOF 26
|
|align=center|2
|align=center|3:21
|Las Vegas, Nevada, United States
|
|-
|Loss
|align=center|7–1
|Marlon Moraes
|Submission (rear-naked choke)
|WSOF 22
|
|align=center|3
|align=center|3:46
|Las Vegas, Nevada, United States
|
|-
|Win
|align=center|7–0
|Gabriel Solorio
|Decision (split)
|WSOF 16
|
|align=center|3
|align=center|5:00
|Sacramento, California, United States
|
|-
|Win
|align=center|6–0
|Felipe Alves
|KO (elbow)
|Nitrix Champion Fight 20
|
|align=center|1
|align=center|0:20
|Blumenau, Brazil
|
|-
|Win
|align=center|5–0
|Eliel dos Santos e Santos
|Decision (split)
|Team Nogueira: MMA Circuit 1
|
|align=center|3
|align=center|5:00
|Rio de Janeiro, Brazil
|
|-
|Win
|align=center|4–0
|Pedro Nobre
|TKO (punches)
|Bitetti Combat 12
|
|align=center|2
|align=center|4:16
|Rio de Janeiro, Brazil
|
|-
|Win
|align=center|3–0
|Pedro Arruda
|TKO (knees to the body)
|Bitetti Combat 12
|
|align=center|1
|align=center|2:33
|Rio de Janeiro, Brazil
|
|-
|Win
|align=center|2–0
|Jefferson Silva dos Santos
|TKO (elbows)
|Mortal Kombat Championship 1
|
|align=center|2
|align=center|2:48
|Rio de Janeiro, Brazil
|
|-
|Win
|align=center|1–0
|Richard Medeiros
|Decision (unanimous)
|Max Fight 11
|
|align=center|3
|align=center|5:00
|São Paulo, Brazil
|
|-

See also
List of male mixed martial artists

References

External links
 Sheymon Moraes at PFL
 
 

1990 births
Living people
Brazilian male mixed martial artists
Brazilian practitioners of Brazilian jiu-jitsu
Brazilian Muay Thai practitioners
Brazilian male judoka
Featherweight mixed martial artists
Bantamweight mixed martial artists
Mixed martial artists utilizing Muay Thai
Mixed martial artists utilizing judo
Mixed martial artists utilizing Brazilian jiu-jitsu
Sportspeople from Niterói
Ultimate Fighting Championship male fighters